Dear X Who Doesn't Love Me is a South Korean web series starring Han Ji-hyo, Doyoung, Kwon Ah-reum, and Bang Jae-min. It aired on TVING from July 14 to July 28, 2022.

Synopsis 
This is a story about an aspiring college student lyricist who intertwined with several men after discovering a note with lyrics that makes her fall in love for a month.

Cast 
 Han Ji-hyo as Seo Hee-soo
 Hee-soo is a college student who wants to become a lyric writer. She has been forever alone, even though she tried out everything to have a relationship. While struggling with low self-esteem, Hee-soo finds a lyrics note that can make her succeed in dating.
 Doyoung as Jung Shi-ho
 Si-ho has long been loving Hee-soo secretly. Rather than breaking up a friendship after confessing his feelings, he thinks it is better to hide. However, when Hee-soo starts to hang out with different guys using a lyrics note, Si-ho starts to get afraid that he will lose Hee-soo forever.
 Kwon Ah-reum as Park Se-jin
 Bang Jae-min as Kim Do-bin
 Son Hyun-woo as Kim Gang-wook
 Kim Ji-hoon as Park Joon-young

Release 
On 30 June 2022, TVING announced that the first three episodes will be released on 14 July 2022, episodes 4 to 6 will be released on 21 July 2022, and the last four episodes will be released on 28 July 2022.

References

External links 
  
 
 

TVING original programming
2022 South Korean television series debuts
2022 South Korean television series endings
Korean-language television shows
2022 web series debuts
South Korean web series
South Korean drama web series